Baster Voetslaan Pass, also known as Dr. LAPA Munnik Pass, is situated in the Eastern Cape, South Africa, on the road between Barkly Pass and Ugie, Eastern Cape.

Driving Skill level: Novice to skilled depending on season
Road condition: Gravel surface, sharp turns, snowfalls, slippery
Remarks: Snowfall in season

Mountain passes of the Eastern Cape